Vognillan is a village in Oppdal municipality in Trøndelag county, Norway.

References

Villages in Trøndelag
Oppdal